Tomás Rengifo is a Salvadoran former swimmer. He competed in two events at the 1972 Summer Olympics.

References

Year of birth missing (living people)
Living people
Salvadoran male swimmers
Olympic swimmers of El Salvador
Swimmers at the 1972 Summer Olympics
Place of birth missing (living people)